Dolní Vilémovice is a municipality and village in Třebíč District in the Vysočina Region of the Czech Republic. It has about 400 inhabitants.

Notable people
Jan Kubiš (1913–1942), soldier involved in the assassination of Reinhard Heydrich

References

Villages in Třebíč District